Cold Skin may refer to:

 Cold Skin (novel), novel by Albert Sánchez Piñol
 Cold Skin (film), 2017 French / Spanish sci-fi horror film based on the novel
 "Cold Skin" (Seven Lions and Echos song), 2016